The Standing Committee on Transport and Communications is a standing committee of the Parliament of Norway. It is responsible for policies relating to transport, postal services, telecommunications, electronic communication and the responsibilities of the Norwegian National Coastal Administration. It corresponds to the Ministry of Transport and Communications and the coastal transport portfolio of the Ministry of Fisheries and Coastal Affairs. The committee has 15 members and is chaired by Linda Cathrine Hofstad Helleland of the Conservative Party.

Members 2009–13

References

Standing committees of the Storting